Collyer may refer to:

People 
 Bud Collyer, American television game show star
 Chad Collyer, American professional wrestler
 Collyer brothers, famous recluses
 Collyer brothers (game designers), the creators of Championship Manager
 Elsie Collyer, acarologist; see :species:Elsie Collyer
 Geoff Collyer, Canadian computer scientist
 Jaime Collyer, Chilean writer
 Joseph Collyer, English engraver
 Mary Collyer, English translator and novelist 
 Robert Collyer, American clergyman

Locations 
 Collyer, Kansas, United States, a city in Trego County
 The College of Richard Collyer, also known as Collyer's, in Horsham, West Sussex, England

See also 
 Collier (disambiguation)
 Colyer (disambiguation)